The 2018–19 William & Mary Tribe women's basketball team represents The College of William & Mary during the 2018–19 NCAA Division I women's basketball season. The Tribe, led by sixth year head coach Ed Swanson, play their home games at Kaplan Arena and were members of the Colonial Athletic Association (CAA). They finished the season 14–17, 7–11 in CAA play to finish in seventh place. They advanced to the quarterfinals of the CAA women's tournament where they lost to Drexel.

Roster

Schedule

|-
!colspan=9 style=| Non-conference regular season

|-
!colspan=9 style=| CAA regular season

|-
!colspan=9 style=|

See also
2018–19 William & Mary Tribe men's basketball team

Footnotes

References

William & Mary Tribe women's basketball seasons
William And Mary
William
William